is a 1946 Japanese drama film directed by Tadashi Imai. It was released on April 25, 1946.

Cast
Susumu Fujita
Akitake Kōno
Kogiku Hanayagi
Ureo Egawa
Takashi Shimura
Ichiro Sugai

Reception
At the 1st Mainichi Film Award, Tadashi Imai won the Award for Best Director and Fumio Hayasaka won the Award for Best Music.

References

External links

1946 drama films
1946 films
Japanese drama films
Films directed by Imai Tadashi
Japanese black-and-white films
1940s Japanese-language films